

History

Surandai Palayam was formed during the reign of Madurai Nayagam Khansagi. It was changed to Sameen during the British rule. Surandai city was formed by amalgamation of villages of Lower Surandai, Bangla Surandai and Mechel Surandai. This town, which used to be a village, was upgraded to a municipality in the 1980s. Surandi was upgraded to a municipality on 24 August 2021 after the creation of Tenkasi district in India. Municipality

Earlier “Surandai” was known as “Raja Sooriya Nallur” then it becomes “Suranthai”. For the past 50 years, the city name is Surandai.

Polygar rule and the revolts
As the Dalavay Mudali, the governor of Tirunelveli, became increasingly independent of Madurai during the time of troubles that began in 1732, some of the Marava polygars of the province openly defied the Dalavay's authority and stopped paying tribute. Polygar Kattari Velladurai was the leader of the defiant polygars from Vadagarai, Nerkattumseval ruled by Puli Thevar and Sivagiri. Surandai was one of the palayams that joined Puli Thevar’s coalition in 1754–1762 but abandoned the cause before the polygars’ final defeat in 1762. When Kollamkondan again rebelled in 1764, following the execution of Yusuf Khan for having betrayed the nawab, Surandai was quick to join. Victories over the Anglo-Nawabi forces helped the revolt spread to other polygars. At the end of the First Polygar War in 1799, the polygar of Surandai surrendered one fort and 61 armed men to Major J. Bannerman.

Zamindari
The Palaiyam survived into the 19th century as a zamindari; at the time of the permanent settlement of 1802, Polygar Sulava Tevar held seven villages. In 1879, the zamindari had an area of 1.34 sq. miles, and a population of 2,580; it was bought by Uthumalai and annexed to that estate in 1874.

Geography
It has an average elevation of 132 metres (433 feet). It is situated 20 km from Coutrallam Falls, 12 km away from Tenkasi and 50 km from Tirunelveli, District Head. It is 30 km away from Sankarankovil. The nearest railway station is Tenkasi and the nearest airport is Tuticorin(Thoothukudi), 86 km from Surandai. Surandai panchayat town comprised Surandai and Keelasurandai, Anai kulam, Kurungavanam, Kulayaneri, Kadayalurutti, Aladipatti, Kurichanpatti, Vadiur, Karayalanoor, Mariathaipuram, Paranguntrapuram, Kalingapatti,  Achankundram, Bangalow Surandai and part of Ammayapuram. Surandai, which was once a village with primarily agricultural and palm tree cultivation with allied activities, presently has grown into a bustling centre for complete trade and business for nearby Panchayats.

Demographics
 India census, Surandai Panchayat had a population of 28,135. Males constitute 50% of the population and females 50%. Surandai has an average literacy rate of 65%, higher than the national average of 59.5%: male literacy is 73%, and female literacy is 57%. In Surandai, 12% of the population is under 6 years of age.

Municipal administration and politics
Surandai municipality established in 2021  initially it was a Town panchayat and upgraded as municipality

Places of Worship 
St. Pauls's Church Keela Surandai
Zion Church
St. Antony's Church
C.S.I Christ Church
Srinivasa Perumal Kovil 
Alagu Parvathi Amman Kovil
Sri Pathirakali Amman Kovil
sri Hanuman & Theradi Madasamy Kovil
Sri Vetri Pathirakali Amman Kovil
Kulathur Ayyanar Kovil
Sri Pottal Madasamy Kovil
Sivagami Amman Sametha Veerapandeeswarar Temple
Sivagami Amman Sametha SivaGurunathar Temple,
Muppidathi Amman Temple, Sivagurunatha Puram,
Sri Muppidathi Amman Temple, Varagunaramapuram.
Sri Sudalai Madasamy Kovil 
Sri Mathalapandi Temple
Arulmigu Kanniamman Kovil
Thirumalai Aandavar Temple in Sivagurunatha Puram
Alagu Parvathy Amman Temple
Arulmigu Sri Vadakuththi Amman Temple, Thiravia Nagar
Arulmigu Sri Thirattu Swamy Temple, Thiravia Nagar
Arulmigu Sri Veyilkantha Amman Temple
Arulmigu Sri Vetri Vinayagar Temple, Thiravia Nagar
Arulmigu Sri Sorna

Schools and colleges
Kamarajar Government Arts College, Surandai
Government Higher Secondary School
Baren Bruck Higher Secondary School
Panchayad Union Primary School
Shri Jayandra Matriculation Higher Secondary School
Muslim Primary School
Jawaharlal Middle School
Jemimah Nursery and Primary School 

Sri Parasakthi Matriculation School (or) 
Sermathai Vasan Higher Secondary School
Rajendra Wisdom School
TDTA Middle School
RC Middle School
Perunthalaivar Kamarajar Government Girls Higher Secondary 
A.G Matriculation School 

TDTA Primary School in Bungalow Surandai
S R Matriculation School

Hospitals
        
Government Hospital,
Ponra Nursing Home,
Maris Hospital,
Kamala Hospital,
Jeyam Haspital,
Thangamathi Hospital,
Mahalakshmi Nursing Home,
Gothai Hospital,
mathura Hospital,
Jeeva Teeth Hospital,
ABI Dental Clinic,
Aravind Eye Hospital, Etc...

Marriage hall

Hindu Nadar Kalyana Mandapam, Sivagurunathapuram
Sivakasi Hindu Nadar Kalyana Mandapam, Sivagurunathapuram
Kulaththur Iyyanar Kalyana Mandapam, Sivagurunathapuram
Hindu Nadar Marriage Hall, Varagunaramapuram
Suba sundari maxi mahal, Sivagurunathapuram
Thevar Thirumana Mandapam, Surandai
Hindu Nadar Thirumana Mandapam, Keela Surandai
Kurinji Mayil Thirumana Mandapam, Keela Surandai
Nadar Magamai Kamiti Thirumana Mandapam, Keela Surandai
 Senaithalaivar kalyana Mandapam,Alagapuri Pattanam.
 Senaithalaivar MAXI Mahal,Alagapuri Pattanam.

References

Cities and towns in Tenkasi district
Madurai Nayak dynasty
Palayam